The Battiest Independent School District is a school district based in Battiest, Oklahoma, United States. It contains an elementary school, a middle school, and a high school. The superintendent is Tommy Turner and the mascot for all grade levels is the Panther.

See also
List of school districts in Oklahoma

References

External links
 Battiest School District
 Battiest Overview

School districts in Oklahoma
Education in McCurtain County, Oklahoma